Penrith City SC is a defunct Australian football (soccer) club that was based in Penrith, New South Wales.  The club, founded in 1984, was an offshoot of the Penrith Panthers rugby league club, participating in the National Soccer League 1984 and 1985 seasons, in the league's Northern Division.

National Soccer League 
The club's first season was moderately successful, with the team finishing in 7th place despite the squad being largely made up of unfancied players (including former professional Roy Cotton), as well as reaching the quarter finals of the NSL Cup. The club's second season in the NSL was less successful. It was knocked out in the first round of the Cup, and finished the 1985 league season in 2nd last place, resulting in relegation to the New South Wales State League, where they played one further season until being taken over by a Uruguayan consortium and being renamed Penrith Uruguayan. This last incarnation lasted until 1989, when the team became defunct.

League History 

Key
 * = North Conference.
  = Relegated.

External links 
 OzFootball Penrith City divisional history

Association football clubs established in 1984
Association football clubs disestablished in 1989
Defunct soccer clubs in Australia
National Soccer League (Australia) teams
Penrith Panthers
Soccer clubs in New South Wales
1984 establishments in Australia
1989 disestablishments in Australia
Penrith, New South Wales